Victoria is an unincorporated community in Jefferson County, in the U.S. state of Missouri.

History
Victoria was platted in 1859. A variant name was "Victoria Station". A post office called Victoria Station was established in 1863, the name was changed to Victoria in 1885, and the post office closed in 1955.

References

Unincorporated communities in Jefferson County, Missouri
Unincorporated communities in Missouri